James Michael Vande Hey (March 15, 1916 – December 21, 2009) was a brigadier general in the United States Air Force.

Biography
Vande Hey was born in Wisconsin in 1916. He graduated from high school in Antigo, Wisconsin, and attended the University of Wisconsin-Madison, the University of the Philippines, and the University of the Philippines Manila. Vande Hey died on December 21, 2009.

Career
Vande Hey was commissioned an officer in the United States Army Air Forces in 1941. During World War II Vande Hey was stationed on Midway Atoll. Following the war he was assigned to Truax Field. In 1949 he was assigned to The Pentagon. He was given command of the 86th Air Division in 1966. His retirement was effective as of May 1, 1971.

Awards he received include the Distinguished Flying Cross with oak leaf cluster, the Bronze Star Medal, the Air Medal with three oak leaf clusters, the Air Force Commendation Medal, the Outstanding Unit Award with oak leaf cluster, the American Defense Service Medal, the American Campaign Medal, the Asiatic-Pacific Campaign Medal with silver service star and two bronze service stars, the World War II Victory Medal, the National Defense Service Medal, the Air Force Longevity Service Award with silver oak leaf cluster, and the Missile Badge.

References

People from Antigo, Wisconsin
Military personnel from Wisconsin
United States Air Force generals
Recipients of the Distinguished Flying Cross (United States)
Recipients of the Air Medal
United States Army Air Forces pilots of World War II
University of Wisconsin–Madison alumni
University of the Philippines Manila alumni
1916 births
2009 deaths
American expatriates in the Philippines